Urmiri Municipality is the third municipal section of the Tomás Frías Province in the Potosí Department in Bolivia. Its seat is Urmiri.

Subdivision 
The municipality consists of the following cantons: 
 Cahuayo
 Urmiri

The people 
The people are predominantly indigenous citizens of Quechua and Aymara descent.

References

External links 
Urmiri Municipality: population data and map

Municipalities of Potosí Department